Albert L. Hester (May 31, 1932 - April 11, 2019) was a professor of journalism at the University of Georgia (UGA), a columnist, historian, newspaper reporter, and author. He wrote more than ten books including Gospel Pilgrim Cemetery: An African-American Historical Site about the Gospel Pilgrim Cemetery for African Americans in Athens, Georgia, and Enduring Legacy: Clarke County, Georgia's Ex-Slave Legislators Madison Davis and Alfred Richardson about Madison Davis and Alfred Richardson. He wrote Athens, Georgia, Celebrating Two Hundred Years at the Millenium with his wife Conoly Hester,  who is also a writer and editor. He also authored some 200 articles.

He was a professor emeritus of the Journalism Department at UGA's Henry W. Grady College of Journalism and Mass Communication. He was Journalism Department chair and director of the Cox International Center for Mass Communication Training and Research, which he founded. It was funded with support from James M. Cox Jr. and provides training and research in support of international journalism.  He retired from the University of Georgia in 1997.

During his career in journalism, Hester was a reporter and editor for the Dallas Times Herald in Dallas, Texas, for 13 years.

Education
Hester received a degree in journalism from Southern Methodist University in Dallas and a master of journalism degree from the University of Wisconsin in Madison, Wisconsin, where he also received his Ph. D. in mass communication.

Partial bibliography

References

External links
Al Hester's webpage

2019 deaths
1932 births
Place of birth missing
American journalism academics
University of Georgia faculty
21st-century American historians
21st-century American male writers
Southern Methodist University alumni
University of Wisconsin–Madison School of Journalism & Mass Communication alumni
American male non-fiction writers